The  is a two-lane national expressway in Kushiro Subprefecture, Hokkaido, Japan. As of July 2019, it connects the city Kushiro to the adjacent town that bears the same name. It is owned and operated by Ministry of Land, Infrastructure, Transport and Tourism and is signed as E38 and E44 under their "2016 Proposal for Realization of Expressway Numbering."

Route description
The Kushiro Sotokan Road was built to reduce congestion along National Routes 38 and 44 through Kushiro and to build part of the larger  with plans to link it to the Dōtō Expressway.

Variable-message signs indicate the speed limit along the road, but the standard limit is 100 km/h.

History
Kushiro Sotokan Road was opened in two stages. The first and largest stage was the construction of the road between Kushiro-nishi Interchange and Kushiro-higashi interchange. It was completed on 12 March 2016. The second stage extended the road east to its current eastern terminus at Kushirobeppo Interchange. This stage was completed on 9 March 2019.

Junction list
The entire expressway is in Kushiro Subprefecture, Hokkaido. Distance markers reflect the distance traveled along the Dōtō Expressway from its terminus at Chitose-Eniwa Junction with the Hokkaido Expressway. 

References

Expressways in Japan